Ypsolopha excisella is a moth of the family Ypsolophidae. It is known from Spain, but has also been recorded from Mongolia and Asia Minor.

References

External links
lepiforum.de

Ypsolophidae
Moths of Europe
Moths of Asia